The 1947–48 Copa del Generalísimo was the 46th staging of the Copa del Rey, the Spanish football cup competition.

The competition began on 14 September 1947 and concluded on 4 July 1948 with the final.

First round

Second round

Third round

Fourth round

|}
Tiebreaker

|}

Fifth round

|}
Tiebreaker

|}

Sixth round

|}

Round of 16

|}

Quarter-finals

|}

Semi-finals

|}
Tiebreaker

|}

Third place

|}

Final

|}

External links
 rsssf.com
 linguasport.com

Copa del Rey seasons
1947–48 in Spanish football cups